David A. Beadle  (1864–1925), was a professional baseball player who played catcher and outfielder in one game in the Major Leagues for the 1884 Detroit Wolverines. He appeared in his game on June 17, 1884 and failed to get a hit in three at-bats. He played in the minor leagues for the Jersey City Skeeters in 1887 and for three separate Central Interstate League teams in 1888.

External links

1864 births
1925 deaths
Major League Baseball catchers
Major League Baseball outfielders
Detroit Wolverines players
19th-century baseball players
Jersey City Skeeters players
Elmira (minor league baseball) players
Bloomington Reds players
Decatur (minor league baseball) players
Baseball players from New York (state)
Burials at Calvary Cemetery (Queens)